is a Japanese slice of life manga series written and illustrated by Naoko Matsuda. It has been serialized in Shogakukan's seinen manga Monthly Big Comic Spirits magazine since September 2012. Its chapters have been collected in seventeen tankōbon volumes as of September 2021. 

The manga was adapted into a 10-episode Japanese television drama series broadcast from April to June 2016. In 2017, the manga won the 62nd Shogakukan Manga Award in the General category.

Characters

Media

Manga
Jūhan Shuttai!, written and illustrated by Naoko Matsuda, started in Shogakukan's Monthly Big Comic Spirits magazine on September 27, 2012. Shogakukan has compiled its chapters into individual tankōbon volumes. The first volume was released on March 29, 2013. As of September 10, 2021, seventeen volumes have been released.

Volume list

Drama

Japanese drama
A Japanese television drama series adaptation of the same title was announced in February 2016. It ran for 10 episodes on TBS from April 12 to June 14, 2016.

Korean drama

A Korean drama adaptation of the manga with the working title Today's Webtoon (오늘의 웹툰), developed by Studio S and co-produced by Binge Works and Studio N, is being prepared for airing on SBS TV in the second half of 2022.

Reception
Volume 4 reached the 50th place on the weekly Oricon manga chart and, as of October 5, 2014, has sold 21,090 copies.

The manga was number four on the 2014 Kono Manga ga Sugoi!s Top 20 Manga for Male Readers survey. It was nominated for the 18th Tezuka Osamu Cultural Prize Reader Award. It was also nominated for the 7th Manga Taishō, receiving 46 points and placing 6th among the ten nominees. In 2017, the manga won the 62nd Shogakukan Manga Award in the General category, sharing it with Blue Giant.

References

External links
 

2016 Japanese television series debuts
2016 Japanese television series endings
2016 in Japanese television
Japanese drama television series
Manga creation in anime and manga
Seinen manga
Shogakukan manga
Slice of life anime and manga
TBS Television (Japan) dramas
Winners of the Shogakukan Manga Award for general manga
Works by Akiko Nogi